Olivier Asselin is a Canadian film director and screenwriter from Quebec. He is most noted for his films The Moving Statue (La Liberté d'une statue), which was the winner of the Prix L.-E.-Ouimet-Molson from the Association québécoise des critiques de cinéma in 1991, and The Cyclotron (Le Cyclotron), for which he won the Borsos Competition Award for Best Screenplay at the 2016 Whistler Film Festival.

He is a professor of art and film history at the Université de Montréal. His filmmaking style is marked by the exploration of philosophical and scientific themes, presented in a highly stylized manner that pays tribute to the aesthetic of older periods in film history, and has been compared to the styles of Guy Maddin and early Lars von Trier.

He is married to Lucille Fluet, who has appeared as an actress in all of his films and was a co-writer of several of them.

Filmography
The Moving Statue (La Liberté d'une statue) - 1990
The Seat of the Soul (Le siège de l'âme) - 1997
A Sentimental Capitalism (Un capitalisme sentimental) - 2008
The Cyclotron (Le Cyclotron) - 2016

References

External links

Living people
Year of birth missing (living people)
20th-century Canadian screenwriters
21st-century Canadian screenwriters
20th-century Canadian male writers
21st-century Canadian male writers
Canadian screenwriters in French
French Quebecers
Film directors from Quebec